Marcus Stuttard has been the chief executive of the Alternative Investment Market in London since 2009. He replaced Martin Graham.

References 

British chief executives
Living people
Year of birth missing (living people)
Place of birth missing (living people)
21st-century British businesspeople